Secondhand Dreaming is the debut album by Christian rock band Ruth. It was released on June 26, 2007, on Tooth & Nail Records and produced by Aaron Sprinkle. "Cross the Line" was the first single and "You Are" was the second single.

A pre-order was available that came autographed and with a free Tooth & Nail sampler that included three tracks from Ruth, The Send and The Glorious Unseen.

Track listing 
"One Foot In, One Foot Out" – 3:56
"Cross the Line" – 3:40
"Secondhand Dreaming" – 3:28
"Here to New York" – 3:28
"Mr. Turner" – 4:09
"Work It Out" – 4:13
"Standing Still" – 2:52
"Figure You Out" – 3:57
"You Are" – 3:18
"Love Me Like You Do" – 4:09
"Always Yours" – 4:09
"Well with Soul" – 4:45

Singles
"Cross the Line"
"You Are"
"One Foot In, One Foot Out"

References

2007 debut albums
Ruth (band) albums
Tooth & Nail Records albums
Albums produced by Aaron Sprinkle